Boyd Lake may refer to:

Boyd Lake (Colorado)
Boyd Lake (Northwest Territories)
Boyd Lake (Nova Scotia)
Boyd Lake (Quebec)
Boyd Lagoon, Western Australia